Matthew Ryan Fondy (born July 28, 1989) is an American soccer player who currently plays for Inter San Francisco in the San Francisco Soccer Football League.

Career

College and amateur
Fondy attended Burlingame High School and played four years of college soccer at the University of California Santa Cruz, where he was a 2009 NSCAA Division III All-American - Third Team

Professional
Though undrafted out of college, Fondy turned professional in 2011 when he signed with the Pittsburgh Riverhounds of the USL Pro league, and made his professional debut on April 9, 2011 in a game against Richmond Kickers. He scored his first professional goal on May 21, 2011 in a 2–0 win against F.C. New York.

Fondy signed with Los Angeles Blues of USL Pro on January 13, 2012. On August 30, 2013, he transferred to Chivas USA of Major League Soccer.

After a stint with Chicago Fire in 2014, Fondy signed with Louisville City of the USL in January 2015.  He scored his first goal for Louisville City against the Tulsa Roughnecks at Slugger Field on April 25.

On September 2, 2015 Fondy set a new USL single season goal scoring record with a hat trick against Harrisburg in a 4-0 win, giving him 21 goals on the season.

Fondy transferred to Jacksonville Armada in February 2016.

On June 27, 2016, the Carolina RailHawks, later North Carolina FC, announced that Fondy had been acquired from Jacksonville Armada.

Fondy joined Oakland Roots SC in January 2020. He had previously featured for the Roots' amateur affiliate, the Oakland Leopards.

Honors

Individual

USL Most Valuable Player: 2015
USL Golden Boot: 2015
USL Scoring Champion: 2015
USL All League First Team: 2015

Retirement
Although no longer in his playing career, Fondy has stayed heavily involved in the sport. Together with Cody Pillon, Fondy co-founded Oakland Genesis, a cost-free youth club in Oakland, CA who view soccer as a tool to empower, educate, and inspire Oakland's leaders of tomorrow. The club provide competitive coaching, academic support, and transportation for all of their players, free of cost. In addition to co-founding the club, Fondy is a coach for some of the program's boys' teams.

Fondy has remained actively playing for various San Francisco Bay Area amateur clubs. Including Oakland SC of the National Premier Soccer League, San Francisco Metro, and Inter San Francisco.

Fondy also represented the United States in futsal at the 2022 Maccabiah Games, alongside former Louisville City teammate Guy Abend.

References

External links
 
 
 UC Santa Cruz bio

1989 births
Living people
20th-century American Jews
People from Foster City, California
UC Santa Cruz Banana Slugs men's soccer players
American soccer players
Association football forwards
USL Championship players
Major League Soccer players
Pittsburgh Riverhounds SC players
Orange County SC players
Chivas USA players
Chicago Fire FC players
Louisville City FC players
North Carolina FC players
Soccer players from California
Sportspeople from the San Francisco Bay Area
Jacksonville Armada FC players
North American Soccer League players
National Premier Soccer League players
Oakland Roots SC players
21st-century American Jews
American men's futsal players